The men's 500 metres in speed skating at the 1998 Winter Olympics took place on 9 and 10 February, at the M-Wave.

Records
Prior to this competition, the existing world and Olympic records were as follows:

The following new Olympic records were set during this competition.

Results

References

Men's speed skating at the 1998 Winter Olympics